The 1953 Green Bay Packers season was their 35th season overall and their 33rd in the National Football League. The team finished with a 2–9–1 record under head coach Gene Ronzani and interim co-coaches Ray McLean, and Hugh Devore, and finished last in the newly named Western Conference.

Fourth-year head coach Ronzani led the team for the first ten games, but resigned after a nationally televised Thanksgiving Day loss, his eighth loss to the Detroit Lions in four seasons; McLean and Devore co-coached the last two games of the season, both losses.
It was the only in-season coaching change in Packers history, until 2018. This season also marked the first season that the Packers played at the recently completed Milwaukee County Stadium.

Offseason

NFL draft 

 Yellow indicates a future Pro Bowl selection
 Green indicates a future Pro Football Hall of Fame inductee

Regular season

Schedule

Standings

Roster

Awards, records, and honors

References 

 Sportsencyclopedia.com

Green Bay Packers seasons
Green Bay Packers
Green